The National Autonomous Federation of Football of Honduras, known as FENAFUTH, is the official football governing body in Honduras and is in charge of the Honduras national team. FENAFUTH was founded in 1951 and joined FIFA the same year. It joined CONCACAF in 1961.

Association staff

See also
Sport in Honduras
Football in Honduras
Women's football in Honduras
Honduras national football team
Honduras women's national football team

References

External links
 FENAFUTH official website
 Honduras at FIFA.com
 Honduras at CONCACAF site

Honduras
Football in Honduras
Hon
Football
Sports organizations established in 1935
1935 establishments in Honduras